The Evangelical Theology Student Council (German: „Studierendenrat Evangelische Theologie“) or SETh, is a German student advisory board which represents the interests of all Evangelical [Lutheran] theology students throughout Germany. More than 40 member organisations, consisted of student representatives at state and clerical universities, as well as student convents of Evangelical churches, belong to the SETh.

Organisation and Work 
The highest organ of the SETh is the three times annually plenary meeting which assembles delegates of all member organisations, residing at places provided by varying student boards within the SETh. Subjects of the plenary meetings are, among others, education and church politics in Germany.

The SETh maintains relations to the Evangelical Church in Germany (German: Evangelische Kirche in Deutschland), the assembly of the Evangelical Theological Faculties in Germany (German: Evangelisch-Theologischer Fakultätentag), the Standing Conference of the Ministers of Education and Cultural Affairs of the Länder in the Federal Republic (German: Kultusminsterkonferenz), and other related organisations.

See also
Christianity in Germany

References

External links 
 Official Website (German)

Student societies in Germany